Civiqs is an online opinion polling and data analytics company founded by Daily Kos founder Markos Moulitsas in March 2018. It is a division of Kos Media, which Moulitsas also founded. The director of Civiqs is Drew Linzer. It is distinguished from other online polling firms by the large number of respondents to its polls, which it has recruited from across the United States through an online panel and asks questions on a daily basis. This allows Civiqs to monitor trends in public opinion over short periods of time, as well as across different demographic and geographic categories.

References

External links

American political websites
Public opinion research companies in the United States
Internet properties established in 2018
2018 establishments in the United States
Analytics companies